A spectral color is a color that is evoked by monochromatic light, i.e. either a single wavelength of light in the visible spectrum, or a relatively narrow band of wavelengths (e.g. lasers). Every wavelength of visible light is perceived as a spectral color; when viewed as a continuous spectrum, these colors are seen as the familiar rainbow.

All colors that do not qualify as a spectral color are called non-spectral colors or extra-spectral colors. Extra-spectral colors cannot be evoked with a single wavelength of light, but rather by a combination of wavelengths. Likewise, light comprising several wavelengths cannot evoke a spectral color.

In color spaces

In color spaces which include all, or most spectral colors, they form a part of boundary of the set of all real colors. When considering a three-dimensional color space (which including luminance), the spectral colors form a surface. When excluding luminance and considering a two-dimensional color space (chromaticity diagram), the spectral colors form a curve known as the spectral locus. For example, the spectral locus of the CIEXYZ chromaticity diagram contains all the spectral colors (to the eye of the standard observer).

A trichromatic color space is defined by three primary colors, which can theoretically be spectral colors. In this case, all other colors are inherently non-spectral. In reality, the spectral bandwidth of most primaries means that most color spaces are entirely non-spectral. Due to different chromaticity properties of different spectral segments, and also due to practical limitations of light sources, the actual distance between RGB pure color wheel colors and spectral colors shows a complicated dependence on the hue. Due to the location of R and G primaries near the ‘almost flat’ spectral segment, RGB color space is reasonably good with approximating spectral orange, yellow, and bright (yellowish) green, but is especially poor in reproducing the visual appearance of spectral colors in the vicinity of central green, and between green and blue, as well as extreme spectral colors approaching IR or UV.

Note that spectral color is universally included in scientific color models such as CIE 1931, but industrial and consumer color spaces such as sRGB, CMYK, and Pantone, do not typically include any spectral colors. Exceptions include Rec. 2020, which uses three spectral colors as primaries (and therefore only includes precisely those three spectral colors), and color spaces such as the ProPhoto RGB color space which use imaginary colors as primaries.

In color models capable of representing spectral colors, such as CIELUV, a spectral color has the maximal saturation. In Helmholtz coordinates, this is described as 100% purity.

In dichromatic color spaces
In dichromatic color vision there is no distinction between spectral and non-spectral colors. Their entire gamut can be represented by spectral colors.

Spectral color terms 

The spectrum is often divided into color terms or names, but aligning boundaries between color terms to a specific wavelength is very subjective.

The first person to decompose white light and name the spectral colors was Isaac Newton. Early in the study of radiometry, Newton was not able to measure the wavelength of the light, but his experiments were repeated contemporarily to estimate wavelengths where his color term boundaries probably lay. Newton's color terms included red, orange, yellow, green, blue, indigo, and violet; this color sequence is still used to describe spectral colors colloquially and a mnemonic for it is commonly known as "Roy G. Biv".

In modern divisions of the spectrum, indigo is often omitted and a blue-green color is sometimes included. Some have argued that Newton's indigo would be equivalent to our modern blue, and his blue equivalent to our blue-green. However, his nonintuitive choices can be better explained. In the table below, note how wavelength is not proportional to hue (which is approximately perceptually uniform). Color systems such as ISCC-NBS attempt to divide the spectrum into sections that appear perceptually uniform. On the other hand, Newton's sections are approximately uniform in size as they would have physically appeared in the diffracted spectrum, i.e. each about 40nm "wide".  In this theory, the sections were divided without influence of his own perception, and each section was then given a name that best suited its average color. In contrast, the sections in the ISCC-NBS spectrum vary greatly in wavelength range, but are more consistent in the hue degree range. Both instances deviate from the basic color terms used in English, only some of which are spectral colors.

The table below includes several definitions where the spectral colors have been categorized in color terms. The hue that a given monochromatic light evokes is approximated at the right side of the table.

Extra-spectral colors

Among some of the colors that are  spectral colors are:

 Grayscale (achromatic) colors, such as white, gray, and black.
 Any color obtained by mixing a gray-scale color and another color (either spectral or not), such as pink (a mixture of a reddish color and white), or brown (a mixture of orange and black or gray).
 Violet-red colors, which in color theory include line of purples colors (such as, approximately, magenta and rose), and other variations of purple and red.
 Impossible colors, which cannot be seen under normal viewing of light, such as over-saturated colors or colors that are seemingly brighter than white.
 Metallic colors which reflect light by effect.

Notes

References 

Color